José Zarzalejo (born 7 November 1942) is a Venezuelan footballer. He played in six matches for the Venezuela national football team from 1967 to 1969. He was also part of Venezuela's squad for the 1967 South American Championship.

References

1942 births
Living people
Venezuelan footballers
Venezuela international footballers
Place of birth missing (living people)
Association football defenders